Murmansk is a city in Russia.

Murmansk may also refer to:
Murmansk Oblast (est. 1938), a federal subject of Russia
Murmansk Okrug (1927–1938), an administrative division of Leningrad Oblast in the Russian SFSR, Soviet Union
Murmansk Governorate (1921–1927), an administrative division of the Russian SFSR, Soviet Union
Murmansk Governorate (1920), an administrative division established by the White Government in Russia in 1920
Murmansk Krai, an informal name used in the Russian SFSR to refer to the territory of modern Murmansk Oblast
2979 Murmansk, a main-belt asteroid

Ships
Soviet cruiser Murmansk, name of two cruisers
Murmansk (1968 icebreaker), a Soviet and later Russian diesel-electric icebreaker in service in 1968–1995
Murmansk (2015 icebreaker), a Russian diesel-electric icebreaker built in 2015